Michael McCarthy (27 February 1917 – 7 May 1959) was a British screenwriter and television and film director. He entered the film industry in 1934 and worked at the Crown Film Unit.

He died aged 42, survived by a wife and three children. A Variety obituary said he was "regarded as a director of considerable promise".

Selected filmography
Greek Testament (1943) (documentary) - assistant director
My Learned Friend (1943) - assistant director
San Demetrio London (1943) - assistant director
The Halfway House (1944) - assistant director
While Nero Fiddled (1944) aka Fiddlers Three - assistant director
The Girl of the Canal (1945) aka Painted Boats (short feature) - story
Johnny Frenchman (1945) - unit manager
Feature Story (1949) (short feature) - director
No Highway in the Sky (1951) - actor
 Assassin for Hire (1951) - director
 Mystery Junction (1951) - director, writer
Road Sense (1951) (instructional film) - director
Hunted (1952) - idea
 Crow Hollow (1952) - director
Wheel of Fate (1953) - actor
Behind the Headlines (1953) - actor
Forces' Sweetheart (1953) - actor
Flannelfoot (1953) - actor
John of the Fair (1954) - director, writer
Douglas Fairbanks, Jr., Presents (1954–55) - director, writer - including The Awakening (1954) 
 Shadow of a Man (1955) - director, additional scenes
The Adventures of the Scarlet Pimpernel (1955) - director
 It's Never Too Late (1956) - director
Assignment Foreign Legion (1956–57) (TV series) - director
 The Traitor (1957) aka The Accursed - director, writer
Wire Service (1957) (TV series) - director
Sailor of Fortune (1957) (TV series) - director
 Operation Amsterdam (1959) - director, writer

References

External links

Michael McCarthy at BFI

British film directors
British male screenwriters
People from Birmingham, West Midlands
1917 births
1959 deaths
20th-century British screenwriters